General elections were held in Haiti on 8 October 1950. Paul Magloire was the only candidate in the presidential election, and was elected unopposed running under the Peasant Worker Movement banner.

Results

President

References

1950 in Haiti
Haiti
Elections in Haiti
Presidential elections in Haiti
Single-candidate elections
Election and referendum articles with incomplete results